The Three-Fox-Skins (hieroglyph) is Gardiner's sign listed no. F31, in the series of parts of animals.  It consists of 3-fox skins tied at one end, and hanging, creating flowing skins.

In Egyptian hieroglyphs it has the value ms. The word in Egyptian means birth, and related items: to bring forth, produce, fashion, create, etc.

The 3-fox-skin hieroglyph has its origins in the early dynasties of Ancient Egypt, and can be found in multiple usage on the Palermo Stone, (creation or inauguration of events).

See also

Gardiner's Sign List#F. Parts of Mammals
List of Egyptian hieroglyphs

References

Betrò, 1995. Hieroglyphics: The Writings of Ancient Egypt, Betrò, Maria Carmela, c. 1995, 1996-(English), Abbeville Press Publishers, New York, London, Paris (hardcover)
Budge.  An Egyptian Hieroglyphic Dictionary, E.A.Wallace Budge, (Dover Publications), c 1978, (c 1920), Dover edition, 1978. (In two volumes, 1314 pp. and cliv-(154) pp.) (softcover)

Egyptian hieroglyphs: parts of mammals